The Star Awards for Best Supporting Actor is an award presented annually at the Star Awards, a ceremony that was established in 1994.

The category was introduced in 1995, at the 2nd Star Awards ceremony; Xie Shaoguang received the award for his role in Larceny of Love and it is given in honour of a Mediacorp actor who has delivered an outstanding performance in a supporting role. The nominees are determined by a team of judges employed by Mediacorp; winners are selected by a majority vote from the entire judging panel.

Since its inception, the award has been given to 19 actors. Jeffrey Xu is the most recent winner in this category for his role in The Takedown. Since the ceremony held in 2006, Huang Yiliang remains as the only actor to win in this category thrice, surpassing Chen Guohua, Chen Hanwei, Chen Shucheng, Tay Ping Hui, and Xie who have two wins each. Chen Shucheng has also been nominated on 11 occasions, more than any other actor. Brandon Wong and Zheng Geping hold the record for the most nominations without a win, with six.

Recipients

Nominees distribution chart

Award records

Multiple awards and nominations

The following individuals received two or more Best Supporting Actor awards:

The following individuals received two or more Best Supporting Actor nominations:

References

External links 

Star Awards